Strandhugg paa Kavringen (The Coastal Raid at Kavringen) is a 65-minute Norwegian film from 1923 that is now considered lost.

The screenplay was written by Gunnar Nilsen-Vig, who was also one of the film's directors. Egil Sætren designed the sets, and Svein Lysell, Lizzie Florelius, Katja Wallier, and Leif Enger appeared in the main roles. Leif Enger was also responsible for makeup. The film also featured the Chat Noir ballet.

The plot has several similarities to Ludvig Holberg's well-known comedy Jeppe on the Hill.

Plot
A poor man is sent by his wife to buy fish. On the way to the fish market, he gets drunk, using the money he was supposed to buy the fish with. The man does not dare go home without fish, and he steals a small boat with fishing gear to try his luck. He does not catch any fish, and he drinks the rest of the alcohol he has left before he falls asleep in the boat. As he sleeps, he dreams that he is engaged in a coastal raid at Kavringen, where he experiences many marvelous things. When he wakes up his wife appears, and the mysteries he experienced in his sleep are resolved by his wife with striking arguments.

Cast
 Svein Lysell as Silas 
 Lizzie Florelius as his wife 
 Katja Wallier as The Beautiful Unknown 
 Leif Enger as the villain

References

External links
 
 Strandhugg paa Kavringen at the National Library of Norway

1923 films
Norwegian black-and-white films
Lost comedy-drama films
Norwegian comedy-drama films
Norwegian silent films
1923 lost films
Lost Norwegian films
1923 comedy-drama films